Dr. Roshan Lal Anand (born 19 January 1924), also known as Dr. R. L. Anand, is an Indian former sports administrator who served as 2nd Secretary General of Asian Handball Federation from 2000 to 2013.

Early life
Roshan Lal Anand was born on 19 January 1924 in Punjab Province, British India. 

He is the longest-serving Director of Netaji Subhas National Institute of Sports (NIS) till date. He was appointed as NIS Director on 4 July 1970 and served in this position for 16 years until his superannuation on 30 November 1986.

Sports administration

Asian Handball Federation
On 26 November 2000, Dr. Anand was elected as Secretary General of Asian Handball Federation, when he succeeded Pakistani sports administrator Syed Abul Hassan. He served in this position for 13 years until 25 October 2013, when he was succeeded by Muhammad Shafiq.

Indian Olympic Association
Anand was elected as Secretary General of Indian Olympic Association from 1986 – 1987. He was also elected as Vice-President of the Indian Olympic Association after 1987.

Handball Federation of India
Anand was one of the founder members of Handball Federation of India (HFI) and was elected as HFI President in 1985 and served in the position till 2010 when he selflessly did not file nomination for the position due to his age. He is the longest serving HFI President to date. He was appointed as Life-President of Handball Federation of India (HFI) for his lifetime services to HFI and for development of handball upon completion of his term as president in 2010 and will hold this position till his last breath.

Others
Anand also served as President of Commonwealth Handball Association and as member of Arbitration Commission of the International Handball Federation.

Awards

Anand was awarded the Padma Shri, the fourth highest civilian award by Government of India in 1976. In photo, Anand receiving the Padma Shri Award from the President of India Fakhruddin Ali Ahmed.

References

External links

1924 births
Living people
Asian Handball Federation
Recipients of the Padma Shri in sports
Indian sports executives and administrators
Punjabi people
People from British India
People from Punjab, India